Ministry of Agriculture and Food Industry is one of the fourteen Moldovan ministries, being the central body of public administration, subordinated to the Government. It has the mission to ensure the realization of the constitutional prerogatives of the Government in the development and promotion of state policy of sustainable development of Agro-industrial sector of the country, by increasing competitiveness and productivity in the sector and ensuring the safety and food sufficiency in the country in order to create the premises for permanent increase in welfare. The current minister is Vladimir Bolea.

Ministers

References 

Agriculture and Food Industry
Moldova
Agriculture in Moldova
Agricultural organizations based in Europe